"Run Run Run" is a 2012 song by the Slovak recording artist Celeste Buckingham. Released on April 4, 2012, the singer herself wrote the song, with assistance from producers Andrej Hruška and Martin Šrámek.

The official music video was credited to the director Tomáš Kasal.

Credits and personnel
 Celeste Buckingham - lead vocalist, writer, producer, publisher
 Andrej Hruška - writer, producer, guitar
 Martin Šrámek - writer, producer, keyboard
 LittleBeat - recording studio
 EMI Czech Republic - distributor

Track listings
 "Run Run Run" (Album version) — 3:42

Charts

Weekly charts

Year-end charts

Music awards and nominations

See also
 List of number-one songs (Slovakia)
 List of number-one songs (Czech Republic)

References
General

Specific

External links
 CelesteBuckingham.com > Music > "Run Run Run"

2012 singles
Celeste Buckingham songs
Songs written by Celeste Buckingham
2012 songs